Vilius Gaubas (born 29 December 2004) is a Lithuanian junior tennis player.

Gaubas has a career high ATP doubles ranking of 1670, achieved on 6 January 2020. He also has a career high ITF juniors ranking of 40, achieved on 23 August 2021.

Gaubas represents Lithuania at the Davis Cup, where he has a W/L record of 0–1.

References

External links

2004 births
Living people
Lithuanian male tennis players
21st-century Lithuanian people